List of actors who have appeared on Star Trek: The Original Series.

Cast

Main cast 

 William Shatner as James T. Kirk, commanding officer of the USS Enterprise.
 Leonard Nimoy as Spock, first officer and science officer.
 DeForest Kelley as Leonard McCoy, chief medical officer.
 James Doohan as Montgomery Scott, chief engineer.
 Nichelle Nichols as Nyota Uhura, communications officer.
 Walter Koenig as Pavel Chekov, navigator and security/tactical officer.  
 George Takei as Hikaru Sulu, helmsman

Recurring cast 

 Majel Barrett as Nurse Christine Chapel, medical officer.
 Grace Lee Whitney as Janice Rand, Captain's yeoman. 
 John Winston as Kyle, operations officer.
 Michael Barrier as Vincent DeSalle, navigator and assistant chief engineer.
 Roger Holloway as Roger Lemli, security officer.
 Eddie Paskey as Leslie, various positions.
 David L. Ross as Galloway, various positions.
 Jim Goodwin as John Farrell, navigator.
 Grant Woods as Kelowitz, science officer.
 William Blackburn as Hadley, helmsman.
 Frank da Vinci as Brent, various positions.
 Ron Veto as Harrison, various positions.

The Animated Series cast 

 William Shatner as James T. Kirk, commanding officer of the USS Enterprise.
 Majel Barrett as Christine Chapel, medical officer.
 James Doohan as Montgomery Scott, chief engineer.
 DeForest Kelley as Leonard McCoy, chief medical officer. 
 Nichelle Nichols as Uhura, communications officer.
 Leonard Nimoy as Spock, first officer and science officer.
 George Takei as Sulu, helmsman.

"The Cage" cast 

 Jeffrey Hunter as Christopher Pike, commanding officer of the USS Enterprise in 2254.
 Majel Barrett as Number One, first officer in 2254.
 Peter Duryea as José Tyler, navigator in 2254.
 Laurel Goodwin as J. M. Colt, Captain's yeoman in 2254.
 John Hoyt as Phillip Boyce, chief medical officer in 2254.
 Leonard Nimoy as Spock,  science officer.

Appearances
  = Main cast (credited) 
  = Recurring cast (4+)
  = Guest cast (1-3)

See also

 List of Star Trek: The Next Generation cast members
 List of Star Trek: Deep Space Nine cast members
 List of Star Trek: Voyager cast members
 List of Star Trek: Enterprise cast members
 List of Star Trek: Discovery cast members

Notes

a: Jeffrey Hunter only appeared in stock footage during the first season. In new material, Pike was played uncredited by Sean Kenney.
b: James Doohan voiced the character in the pilot of the animated series. The character continued to appear throughout the series but did not have any more lines.
c: A young version of the character is played by Jonathan Simpson in Star Trek V: The Final Frontier.
d: Majel Barrett voiced the character in the animated series.
e: The role was played by Kirstie Alley in Star Trek II: The Wrath of Khan.

Star Trek: The Original Series
Cast
cast of Original Series